The  Detroit Lions season was the franchise's 83rd season in the National Football League, their 79th as the Detroit Lions and the fourth under head coach Jim Schwartz. The Lions failed to improve from their 10–6 record in 2011, during which they made it to the postseason as a wild card team. The Lions spent most of the season at the bottom of their division, and ended the season with an eight-game losing streak, their worst skid since the winless 2008 season. It was also the franchise's 21st consecutive season without a playoff win.

The Lions set an NFL record with 740 pass attempts during the season (46.25 attempts per game), breaking a record that had stood for thirty years.

This was the final season for longtime Lions placekicker Jason Hanson, who in his 21st season with the team (and in the league) and at age 42 was the NFL's oldest active player. Hanson retired on April 4, 2013.

Calvin Johnson broke Jerry Rice’s record for most receiving yards in a single season with 1,964 yards in 122 catches.

Offseason

Signings

Jacob Lacey signed with the Detroit Lions on March 20, 2012.

Releases
Cornerback Aaron Berry was released on July 23, 2012 after his second arrest of the offseason.

2012 Draft class

Final roster

Schedule

Preseason

Regular season

Note: Intra-division opponents are in bold text.

Regular season results

Standings

Week 1: vs. St. Louis Rams

To open the regular season, the Lions hosted the St. Louis Rams. The Rams took an early lead when Greg Zuerlein kicked a 48-yard field goal, the only scoring drive of the first quarter. The Lions responded in the second quarter when Joique Bell ran in a touchdown from 1 yard out. St. Louis made it a 1-point game when Greg Zuerlein kicked a 29-yard field goal, and took the lead again when Cortland Finnegan intercepted a Matthew Stafford pass and ran it back 31 yards for a touchdown. The final points of the half were scored when Detroit's Jason Hanson kicked a 41-yard field goal. The only points of the third quarter was a 45-yard field goal by Jason Hanson to tie the game. In the  final quarter, the score continued to sea-saw. First the Rams' Brandon Gibson caught a 23-yard touchdown pass from Sam Bradford to take the lead back again, but the Lions soon tied it back up when Kevin Smith ran in a touchdown from 5 yards out. The Rams then went up by 3 points when kicked Greg Zuerlein his third field goal of the game, this one from 46 yards out. In the final 2 minutes, the Lions completed their third 80-yard scoring drive with a game-winning 5-yard touchdown catch by Kevin Smith, his second of the game.  The Lions were able to start 1–0 and capture their second straight regular season opening win.

Week 2: at San Francisco 49ers

In week 2, the Lions flew west to play the San Francisco 49ers on Sunday Night Football. The 49ers got on the board first with a 21-yard touchdown pass from Alex Smith to Vernon Davis. The Lions responded with two field goals by Jason Hanson, from 38 and 41 yards respectively. The only scoring play of the second quarter was a 1-yard touchdown run by Frank Gore. In the third quarter came a pair of field goals, first a 36-yard kick by San Francisco's David Akers, and later a 40-yard one from Detroit's Jason Hanson. In the final quarter, both teams kicked two more field goals both from 48 yards out, first the 49ers' David Akers, then the Lions' Jason Hanson. Next, San Francisco's Vernon Davis caught his second touchdown pass of the game, this one from 23 yards out. Lastly, Detroit scored their only touchdown of the game when Brandon Pettigrew caught a 9-yard pass from Matthew Stafford dropping the team to 1–1.

Week 3: at Tennessee Titans

In week 3, the Lions traveled south to Nashville to play the Tennessee Titans. This game was the highest scoring game of the 2012 NFL season. Detroit started the scoring in the first quarter with a pair of field goals by Jason Hanson, from 47 and 53 yards respectively. On the Titans first drive, they fumbled the snap and the Lions recovered the ball. The Titans responded with a 31-yard field goal by Rob Bironas, and took the lead when Darius Reynaud caught a Ben Graham punt and threw a lateral to Tommie Campbell who ran back a 65-yard touchdown. Tennessee added more points in the second quarter when Jared Cook caught a 61-yard touchdown pass from Jake Locker. The Lions responded when Jason Hanson kicked a 33-yard field goal. The final points of the first half was a 38-yard kick by The Titans' Rob Bironas. The only points of the third quarter was a 1-yard touchdown run by Detroit's Mikel Leshoure, sandwiched between two missed FGAs by Bironas. The fourth quarter scoring started when Jason Hanson kicked a 26-yard field goal. Next, the Lions' Nate Burleson caught a 3-yard touchdown pass from Matthew Stafford and the same duo completed a two-point conversion. Tennessee then scored 3 consecutive touchdowns. First, after already returning a punt for a touchdown,  Darius Reynaud returned a kickoff 105 yards for a touchdown. Following a Lions punt, Nate Washington caught a 71-yard touchdown pass from Locker.  The Lions drove deep into Titans territory on the next drive but Alterraun Verner yanked the ball out of Brandon Pettigrew's hands and ran back a 72-yard touchdown. Matthew Stafford had to come out of the game with a pulled leg muscle and Shaun Hill responded with a drive ending in a three-yard touchdown to Calvin Johnson with just twenty seconds to go.  The Lions kicked onside and Amari Spievey caught the ball off a bounce at the Detroit 35-yard line. Even if Spievey did recover the onside and drove down the field further, his team was set up on the 46-yard line. On the final play of regulation, Hill went deep and Titus Young caught the 46-yard touchdown off a partial deflection. Tied 41–41, the game went to overtime. After winning the coin toss, the Titans' Rob Bironas kicked the game-winning a field goal from 26 yards out. The Lions then drove down field, but were stopped on a fourth-down stand at the Titans 7-yard line as the team fell to 1–2.

Week 4: vs. Minnesota Vikings

In week 4, the Lions hosted their NFC North Division rivals the Minnesota Vikings. The Vikings took an early lead when Percy Harvin returned the opening kickoff 105 yards for a touchdown. The Lions responded with a 40-yard field goal by Jason Hanson. Minnesota's Blair Walsh then kicked a field goal from 49 yards out. Both teams kicked a field goal in the second quarter, first Minnesota's Blair Walsh from 27 yards out, then Detroit's Jason Hanson from 31 yards. The only scoring drive of the third quarter was when the Vikings' Marcus Sherels returned a punt 77 yards for a touchdown. The Lions scored the only points of the final quarter when quarterback Matthew Stafford completed a 1-yard run for a touchdown.  With the loss, the Lions went into their bye week at 1–3.

Week 6: at Philadelphia Eagles

After their bye week, the Lions traveled east to play the Philadelphia Eagles. The Lions took an early lead in the first quarter with two field goals by Jason Hanson, from 46 and 34 yards out. The only scoring drive of the second quarter was a 2-yard touchdown pass from Michael Vick to LeSean McCoy to put Philadelphia up by 1 point. In the third quarter the Eagles' Alex Henery kicked 2 field goals, from 26 and 32 yards out. In the fourth quarter, Alex Henery kicked a 49-yard field goal. The Lions responded with a 1-yard touchdown run by Matthew Stafford. The Eagles' Jeremy Maclin then caught a 70-yard touchdown pass from Michael Vick. The Lions responded with their own touchdown pass, a 17-yarder from Matthew Stafford to Nate Burleson. The Lions took it to overtime after Jason Hanson kicked a 19-yard field goal. On the second drive in Overtime, the Lions' Jason Hanson kicked the game-winning field goal from 45 yards out.  With the win, the Lions improved to 2–3, snapping their 3-game losing streak.

Week 7: at Chicago Bears

In week 7, the Lions traveled to Chicago to take on their NFC North Division arch-rivals the Chicago Bears on Monday Night Football. The Bears struck first when Brandon Marshall caught a 7-yard touchdown pass from Jay Cutler, and added more points when Robbie Gould kicked a 39-yard field goal. After a scoreless second quarter, the Bears' Robbie Gould scored the only points of the third quarter with a 21-yard field goal. The Lions scored their only points of the game in the fourth quarter when Ryan Broyles caught a 12-yard touchdown pass from Matthew Stafford. It was their fifth straight loss at Chicago as they dropped to 2–4 on the season.

Week 8: vs. Seattle Seahawks

In week 8, the Lions hosted the Seattle Seahawks. Seattle started the scoring with a 23-yard field goal by Steven Hauschka. The Lions then took the lead when Ryan Broyles caught a 6-yard touchdown pass from Matthew Stafford. In the second quarter, the Seahawks scored 2 consecutive touchdowns: first with a Marshawn Lynch 77-yard run, then with a Sidney Rice 9-yard catch from Russell Wilson. The Lions responded with a Titus Young 46-yard touchdown pass from Matthew Stafford. After a scoreless third quarter, the Lions took the lead back when Matthew Stafford ran in a touchdown from 1 yard out. Seattle went up by 3 points with a Zach Miller 16-yard catch from Russell Wilson. The Lions' Titus Young then scored the game-winning touchdown with 1-yard pass from Matthew Stafford.

Week 9: at Jacksonville Jaguars

In week 9, the Lions flew south to play the Jacksonville Jaguars. After a scoreless first quarter, the Lions' Mikel Leshoure ran in three consecutive touchdowns, from 7, 1, and 8 yards out respectively to take a 21-point lead going into halftime. Leshoure became the first Lions rusher to score three touchdowns in the first half. After a scoreless third quarter, Detroit's Jason Hanson kicked a 42-yard field goal. The Jaguars finally got on the board when Micheal Spurlock caught a 5-yard touchdown pass from Blaine Gabbert; they then completed a two-point conversion when Blaine Gabbert completed a pass to Rashad Jennings. The Lions responded with a 10-yard touchdown run from Joique Bell. Jacksonville scored the final points of the game with a 6-yard touchdown catch from Blaine Gabbert to Justin Blackmon; they again went for a two-point conversion, but were unsuccessful this time. It was the Lions' most lopsided win of the season and would also be their final victory of the 2012 season.

Week 10: at Minnesota Vikings

In week 10, the Lions traveled to Minneapolis to play their NFC North rival the Minnesota Vikings. Minnesota took an early lead when Jarius Wright caught a 3-yard touchdown pass from Christian Ponder, and added more points when Blair Walsh kicked a 58-yard field goal. In the second quarter, the Lions scored their only points of the first half when Jason Hanson scored a 41-yard field goal. The Vikings responded with a 23-yard field goal by Blair Walsh. After halftime, the Blair Walsh kicked another 23-yard field goal. The Lions responded with a Brandon Pettigrew caught a 16-yard touchdown pass from Matthew Stafford. In the final quarter, Minnesota's Kyle Rudolph caught a 20-yard touchdown pass from Christian Ponder, and Adrian Peterson ran the ball in for a two-point conversion. The Lions responded when Titus Young caught a 1-yard touchdown pass from Matthew Stafford. The Vikings added to their lead when Adrian Peterson completed a 61-yard touchdown run, then Blair Walsh scored a 33-yard field goal. The Lions scored the game's final points when Calvin Johnson caught an 11-yard touchdown pass from Matthew Stafford.

Week 11: vs. Green Bay Packers

In week 11, the Lions hosted their NFC North Division rivals the Green Bay Packers. The only scoring play of the first quarter was when Detroit's Jason Hanson kicked a 30-yard field goal. The Packers got on the board in the second quarter when Jermichael Finley caught a 20-yard touchdown pass from Aaron Rodgers. The Lions responded with a 1-yard touchdown run by Mikel Leshoure. In the third quarter, the Packers' M. D. Jennings intercepted a Matthew Stafford pass and ran it back 72 yards for a touchdown. The Lions responded with a Calvin Johnson 25-yard touchdown pass from Matthew Stafford. The Lions scored their final points in the fourth quarter when Jason Hanson kicked a 27-yard field goal. The Packers then scored a touchdown when Randall Cobb caught a 22-yard pass from Aaron Rodgers, and capped off their win with a 39-yard field goal by Mason Crosby.

Week 12: vs. Houston Texans

For their annual Thanksgiving Day game, the Lions hosted the Houston Texans. The Lions got on the board early when Mikel Leshoure ran in a touchdown from 2 yards out. The score sea-sawed in the second quarter, with each team scoring a pair of touchdowns. First, the Texans' Arian Foster rushed in a touchdown from 6 yards out. The Lions responded with a 5-yard touchdown run from Mike Foster. Houston's Owen Daniels then caught a 9-yard touchdown pass from Matt Schaub. The Lions' Calvin Johnson then caught a 22-yard touchdown pass. After halftime, Detroit's Jason Hanson kicked a 46-yard field goal. Houston responded with an 81-yard touchdown rush by Justin Forsett, which would have been overturned by an official review, but Coach Jim Schwartz's challenge flag negated the review. The Texans tied it up yet again with a 45-yard field goal by Shayne Graham. In the fourth quarter, the Lions took the lead back with a 23-yard touchdown run by Joique Bell, but Houston tied it back up with a 1-yard run by Arian Foster inside the 2-minute warning to take it to overtime. After a pair of turnovers and missed field goals by each team, Houston's Shayne Graham kicked the game-winning field goal from 32-yards out. It was the Lions' ninth consecutive Thanksgiving loss.

Week 13: vs. Indianapolis Colts

In week 13, the Lions hosted the Indianapolis Colts. They started the scoring when Jason Hanson kicked a 48-yard field goal. The Colts responded with a 17-yard touchdown catch by Donnie Avery from Andrew Luck. Detroit replied when Brandon Pettigrew caught a 16-yard touchdown pass from Matthew Stafford, and added to their lead in the second quarter when Mikel Leshoure ran in a touchdown from 6 yards out. The Colts scored their only points of the second quarter when Coby Fleener caught a 26-yard touchdown pass from Andrew Luck. The Lions closed out the half with 2 field goals from Jason Hanson from 33 and 52 yards out respectively. Each team scored a touchdown in the third quarter. First the Colts' Vick Ballard ran one in from 11 yards out, then Detroit's Calvin Johnson caught 46-yard touchdown pass from Matthew Stafford. The Lions' only points of the final quarter was a 31-yard field goal by Jason Hanson. The Colts then rallied from behind with two touchdowns. First LaVon Brazill caught a 42-yard pass from Andrew Luck, then Donnie Avery caught a 14-yard pass from Andrew Luck in the final seconds of the game for the win. It was the Lions' third consecutive loss in which they were leading with less than 2 minutes left in the game.

Week 14 at Green Bay Packers

In week 14, the Lions flew across Lake Michigan for a rematch with NFC North Division rivals the Green Bay Packers on Sunday Night Football. The only scoring drive of the first quarter was when Lions quarterback Matthew Stafford ran in a touchdown himself from 4 yards out. The Lions added more points in the second quarter when Tony Scheffler caught a Matthew Stafford pass from 3 yards out. The Packers got on the board when Mason Crosby kicked a 49-yard field goal, and added more points when Mike Daniels picked up a Matthew Stafford fumble and ran it back 43 yards for a touchdown to make it 14–10 at halftime. In the third quarter, the Packers took their first lead of the game when quarterback Aaron Rodgers ran in a touchdown from 27 yards, but the Lions tied it up a few minutes later when Jason Hanson kicked a 46-yard field goal. In the final quarter, the Packers took the lead back when DuJuan Harris ran in a touchdown from 14 yards out, and went up by 10 points when Mason Crosby kicked a 41-yard field goal. The Lions' Jason Hanson kicked a 34-yard field goal in the final seconds of the game, and the Lions attempted to recover an onside kick afterward to try to tie it up and take it to overtime, but failed. It was the Packers' 21st consecutive home win over the Lions, a streak that dates back to 1992, and now eclipses the Lions' current road losing streak vs the Washington Redskins, which stands at 0–21.

Week 15: at Arizona Cardinals

In week 15, the Lions played their last road game of the season out west against the Arizona Cardinals. After a scoreless first quarter, the Lions scored their only points of the first half with a 1-yard touchdown run by Mikel Leshoure. The Cardinals responded with 3 consecutive touchdowns: first, Beanie Wells scored a pair of rushing touchdowns from 5 and 1 yards out respectively, then Rashad Johnson intercepted a Matthew Stafford pass and ran it back 53 yards to put the Cardinals up 21–7 at halftime. Each team kicked a field goal in the third quarter: first the Cardinals' Jay Feely from 51 yards, then Detroit's Jason Hanson from 41 yards. Arizona capped their win with two touchdowns in the final quarter: first Greg Toler intercepted a Matthew Stafford pass in the end zone and ran 102 yards for a touchdown, then Beanie Wells scored his third touchdown of the game, this one from 31 yards out.

Week 16: vs. Atlanta Falcons

In week 16, the Lions hosted the Atlanta Falcons on a Saturday night. Atlanta took an early lead, which they never gave back, when Roddy White caught a 44-yard touchdown pass from Matt Ryan. The Lions responded with a 34-yard field goal by Jason Hanson. In the second quarter, the Falcons' Roddy White caught another touchdown pass, this one from 39 yards out. Atlanta added more points when Julio Jones caught a 16-yard touchdown pass. The Lions ended the first half with a 38-yard field goal by Jason Hanson. The only points of the third quarter was a 1-yard touchdown run by Detroit's Mikel Leshoure. The Lions scored another field goal to start the fourth quarter, this one from 20 yards out. The Falcons added 10 more points when Michael Palmer caught a 1-yard touchdown pass, then Matt Bryant kicked a 20-yard field goal. The Lions scored the game's final points when Atlanta's Michael Turner was tackled in his own end zone for a Detroit safety. The game's biggest highlight was when Detroit's Calvin Johnson surpassed Jerry Rice's 1,848-yard single season receiving record from 1995. At the end of the game, Johnson had compiled 1,892 receiving yards on the year.

Week 17: vs. Chicago Bears

For their last game of the season, the Lions hosted a rematch against their NFC North Division rival the Chicago Bears. The Lions took an early lead in the first quarter when Jason Hanson kicked a 44-yard field goal. The Bears then took the lead, which they never gave back, when Earl Bennett caught a 60-yard touchdown pass from Jay Cutler, and added more 3 points when Olindo Mare kicked a 33-yard field goal. The Lions responded when Kris Durham caught a 25-yard touchdown pass from Matthew Stafford to make it 20–10 at halftime. After the intermission, Detroit scored another touchdown, this one with a 10-yard catch by Will Heller from Matthew Stafford. The Bears responded with a pair of field goals by Olindo Mare, first one from 28-yards late in the third quarter, then one from 20 yards out early in the fourth. The Lions scored the final points of the game when Brian Robiskie caught a 9-yard pass from Matthew Stafford. With their eight consecutive loss, the Lions finished their season at 4–12. Also, for the second time under Coach Schwartz's tenure which began in 2009, the team failed to win a single division game. It was also his third losing season.

Staff

Notes and references

External links
 Detroit Lions official website

Detroit
Detroit Lions seasons
2012 in sports in Michigan